Gyaritus giganteus is a species of beetle in the family Cerambycidae. It was described by Stephan von Breuning in 1938. It is found in Borneo.

References

Gyaritini
Beetles described in 1938